The 2014–15 Northern Arizona Lumberjacks men's basketball team represented Northern Arizona University during the 2014–15 NCAA Division I men's basketball season. The Lumberjacks were led by third year head coach Jack Murphy and played their home games at the Walkup Skydome. They were members of the Big Sky Conference. They finished the season 23–15, 13–5 in Big Sky play to finish in a tie for third place. They advanced to the semifinals of the Big Sky tournament where they lost to Montana. They were invited to the CollegeInsider.com Tournament where they defeated Grand Canyon, Sacramento State, Kent State, and NJIT to advance to the CIT championship game where they lost to Evansville.

Roster

Schedule

|-
!colspan=9 style="background:#003466; color:#FFCC00;"| Exhibition

|-
!colspan=9 style="background:#003466; color:#FFCC00;"| Regular season

|-
!colspan=9 style="background:#003466; color:#FFCC00;"| Big Sky tournament

|-
!colspan=9 style="background:#003466; color:#FFCC00;"| CIT

See also
2014–15 Northern Arizona Lumberjacks women's basketball team

References

Northern Arizona Lumberjacks men's basketball seasons
Northern Arizona
Northern Arizona